Eupithecia turbanta is a moth in the family Geometridae. It is found in Ecuador.

References

Moths described in 1899
turbanta
Moths of South America